Dominic Dugasse (born 19 April 1985) is a Seychellois judoka who competed in the -100 kg event at the 2012 Summer Olympics in London, where he lost in the first round of the event to Henk Grol of the Netherlands. He was the flag bearer for the Seychelles during the 2012 Summer Olympics opening ceremony.

In 2013, he was voted Sportsman of the Year at the Seychelles Sports Awards, the first time a judoka had won the honour.

References

External links
 

Seychellois male judoka
1985 births
Olympic judoka of Seychelles
Judoka at the 2012 Summer Olympics
Judoka at the 2016 Summer Olympics
Living people
Judoka at the 2014 Commonwealth Games
Commonwealth Games competitors for Seychelles
20th-century Seychellois people
21st-century Seychellois people